The Central West Junior Hockey League was an ice hockey league in Newfoundland and Labrador, Canada.  The league consists three teams that compete against each other in an 18-game season. The playoffs include two rounds, the first round is a best of five series, with the winner of each series compete for the Exploits Home Hardware Cup in a best of seven series.

Until 2013, after the conclusion of the playoffs the winner competes for the Veitch Memorial Trophy against the winner in the St. John's Junior Hockey League. Winners of the Veitch Memorial Trophy earns the right to represent Newfoundland and Labrador in the Don Johnson Cup.

History
Through the years the CWJHL was a league that could churn out a strong contender for the Veitch Memorial Trophy. During the last two seasons experienced a massive drop in talent. At the 2011 Provincials, the Central Jr. Cataracts lost to the St. John's Jr. Celtics of the St. John's Junior Hockey League 5–3 in the round robin and 2–1 in the final. A year later at the 2012 Provincials, the champion Humber Valley Jr. Red Wings lost 16–2 to the SJJHL's St. John's Jr. Caps and 11–1 to the Mount Pearl Jr. Blades. In 2013, the champion Bishop's Falls Jr. Express lost 17–1 to the Jr. Caps in the semi-final and in the final the host Stephenville Jr. Jets lost 15–2.

The drop in competitiveness within the CWJHL combined with a lack of volunteers to run the league led Hockey Newfoundland and Labrador to demote the league to Junior C after the 2012–13 season. When league members missed the deadline to register for the Maritime-Hockey North Junior C Championships, organization for the season faltered and never materialized.

Past teams 

Bay St. George Junior Jets
Bishop's Falls Jr. Express
Central Jr. Arctic Blast
Central Jr. Cataracts
Corner Brook Junior Royals
Deer Lake Junior Red Wings
Humber Valley Junior Red Wings
Port Aux Basque Centennials
Port-Aux-Basques Jr. Mariners
Stephenville Jr. Jets
Triton Roadrunners

Champions

See also
List of ice hockey teams in Newfoundland and Labrador

References

External links
CWJHL website

Ice hockey leagues in Newfoundland and Labrador
C